Rolando Aguilar (1903–1984) was a Mexican film director and screenwriter.

Selected filmography
 Mothers of the World (1936)
 These Men (1937)
 Glorious Nights (1938)
 The Miracle Song (1940)
 Rosalinda (1945)
 Adventure in the Night (1948)

References

Bibliography
 Rogelio Agrasánchez. Guillermo Calles: A Biography of the Actor and Mexican Cinema Pioneer. McFarland, 2010.

External links

1903 births
1984 deaths
Mexican male screenwriters
Mexican film directors
People from San Miguel de Allende
Writers from Guanajuato
20th-century Mexican screenwriters
20th-century Mexican male writers